Patrick Bingham-Hall is an architectural photographer.  He is also an architectural writer and editor, and owns Pesaro Publishing, which publishes books on architecture and design.

Education
He was born on 15 July 1958 in Aden in Yemen, where his father (Group Captain T. L. Bingham-Hall) was in command of the Royal Air Force base, and spent his early years in London before emigrating to Australia in 1963.  He was educated at Sydney Church of England Grammar School (Shore) and studied philosophy at Macquarie University for one year, before taking up photography at Sydney College of the Arts.  He left in his second year to start his own photographic studio, and specialised in rock and roll photography, working with bands like Radio Birdman and The Saints.  His cover photograph of the Radio Birdman album Living Eyes is of the underground rock scene in Australia.

Career

He began photographing architecture in the early 1980s, and travelled the world to study architectural history and to photograph classic buildings.  Many of these photographs were included in his first (self-published) book Monumental Irony. In the 1990s he took the photographs for many books on Australian architecture, and was selected as editor of the book that documented the architecture for the 2000 Sydney Olympic Games. He also wrote Austral Eden, an idiosyncratic history of Australian architecture, and contributed articles to magazines in Australia and England. In 1999, he formed his own publishing company, Pesaro Publishing, which was to publish many books on Australian architecture within a few years.  Bingham-Hall was usually editor and photographer.  Most of his early books for Pesaro were done in collaboration with Philip Goad, an architectural writer and academic from Melbourne.  After publishing Architecture Bali in 2000, Bingham-Hall expanded his publishing into Asia, while continuing to produce books on Australian architecture and wrote many of the books himself, particularly on tropical architecture in Asia.  He is the author of monographs on WOHA Architects, Guz Architects, Peter Stutchbury, Colin K. Okashimo, K2LD Architects, Cicada Landscape Architects, LOOK Architects, and a book on houses in the Asia-Pacific region.

Patrick Bingham-Hall is married to Katrina, and they have five children.  His house in Balmain, Sydney, was designed by Rex Addison. He lived in Singapore for many years, before returning to England.

Books by Patrick Bingham-Hall

Exhibitions
 Parliament House, Canberra, Australia 1988
 RAIA Tusculum, Sydney, Australia 1990
 State Library of New South Wales, Sydney, Australia 1999
 Brisbane City Hall, Queensland, Australia 2004
 RIBA, London, England 2004
 Esplanade Theatres on the Bay, Singapore 2004
 WOHAGA Gallery, Singapore 2007
 Deutsches Arkitektur Museum, Frankfurt, Germany 2011
 Creative Design Space at NAFA, Singapore 2012

References

External links

The New Asia Pacific House by Patrick Bingham-Hall. Houses – Aug 2011 (issue: 81). ArchitectureAU.
Patrick Bingham-Hall took the best photos ever last night!. Friday, 5 November 2010. LAVA Laboratory for Visionary Architecture.
Master Class by Wong Mun Summ and Richard Hassell, WOHA. NUS – National University of Singapore.
Peter Stutchbury: Selected Projects. Houses – Jun 2011 (issue: 80). ArchitectureAU.
Books – September/October 1999. AA.
Here we go ....  30 September 2009. Monument Magazine.
BALI STYLE GOES BALLISTIC. SIP – Stranger in Paradise.
WOHA: Selected Projects Vol. 1. Houses – Dec 2011 (issue: 83). ArchitectureAU.
Rod Sheard and Patrick Bingham-Hall, The Stadium: Architecture for the New Global Culture, Pesaro Publishing, Sydney, 2005. Illus., pp. 208, hb, $55.00. Reviews. p. 145;.
Book Review: New Asia Pacific House. Sue Jeffery, The West Australian 1 February 2011.
Books – January/February 2000. AA.

1958 births
Architectural photographers
Australian architecture writers
Living people
Australian photographers